The Glen Canyon Bridge or Glen Canyon Dam Bridge is a steel arch bridge in Coconino County, Arizona, carrying U.S. Route 89 across the Colorado River. The bridge was the highest arch bridge in the world when completed in 1959.

See also

 List of highest bridges

References

Colorado River Bridge at Glen Canyon Dam,
Arizona U.S.A.
Autor(en): Sailer, Robert

U.S. Route 89
Bridges of the United States Numbered Highway System
Road bridges in Arizona
Transportation in Coconino County, Arizona
Bridges over the Colorado River
Steel bridges in the United States
Open-spandrel deck arch bridges in the United States
Buildings and structures in Coconino County, Arizona